On 11 January 2016, a series of terrorist attacks occurred in Baghdad and Miqdadiyah, Iraq. The attack resulted in 132 people being killed, including the six attackers.

Events
At least 12 people were killed in an attack on the Al-Jawhara shopping mall in Baghdad after a car bomb exploded outside. Hostages were taken by six gunmen in the incident. At least 19 people were injured.

A double blast at a cafe north of the Iraqi capital claimed another 20 lives in the late afternoon in the town of Muqdadiyah northeast of Baghdad. A suicide bomber detonated an explosives-rigged vehicle after people gathered at the scene. The Islamic State of Iraq and the Levant (ISIL) claimed the attack and named the suicide bomber as Abu Abdallah, an Iraqi. The security officers said that Shiites set alight several Sunni homes and a mosque following the attack.

Two huge bomb blasts, one at a tea shop and the other at a mosque, killed at least 100 people in the township of Sharaban in Iraq's northern Diyala province. The first blast went off at a tea shop in the neighborhood of Asri and the second one targeted Nazanda Khatun Mosque while the prayers were going on. The second blast went off after security forces and people arrived to the scene. ISIL claimed responsibility for the explosions shortly after it took place.

Reaction
 The attack gained attention after a survivor posted his account of the attacks and the victims on the website Reddit.
 : Foreign Ministry statemented condemning terrorist attacks, expressed condolences for deaths and "the friendly and brotherly people of Iraq". And said they will be resolutely remaining to support Iraq's fight against terrorism.

References

2016 murders in Iraq
21st-century mass murder in Iraq
Mass murder in 2016
Mass murder in Iraq
Terrorist incidents in Iraq in 2016
January 2016 crimes in Asia
Car and truck bombings in Iraq
Suicide bombings in Iraq
Terrorist incidents in Baghdad
January 2016 events in Iraq
Attacks on buildings and structures in Iraq